El Parian is the oldest mall in the city of Aguascalientes, Mexico.

Location
Located in north side of the downtown area, El Parian, which now stands as a three-floor shopping center, once was a main point of sale for farm products.

Shopping malls in Mexico